King of Mask Singer is a Chinese reality singing competition television series based on the Masked Singer franchise which originated from the South Korean version of the show King of Mask Singer. It premiered on Jiangsu Television on July 19, 2015.

References

2015 Chinese television series debuts
2015 Chinese television series endings
Chinese music television series
Chinese-language television shows
Chinese television series based on South Korean television series
Masked Singer
Jiangsu Television original programming